The 2019 ManBetX Welsh Open was a professional ranking snooker tournament which took place from 11 to 17 February 2019 at the Motorpoint Arena in Cardiff, Wales. It was the thirteenth ranking event of the 2018/2019 season, and the final event of the season's Home Nations Series.

John Higgins was the defending champion, having beaten Barry Hawkins 9–7 in the 2018 final, but he was defeated 3–5 by Joe O'Connor in the quarter-finals.

Neil Robertson won the event, gaining his fifteenth ranking title, and his second Home Nations triumph since the re-brand in 2016, becoming the second player to claim two Home Nations victories after Stuart Bingham, whom he defeated 9–7 in the final. Bingham made eleven centuries throughout the tournament, while Robertson made the fourth 147 break of his career in the fourth frame of his Round 1 match with Jordan Brown, followed by a 140 break to win the match 4–1.

Noppon Saengkham made his first ever professionally recorded 147 break in the second frame of his third round match against Mark Selby. It was the fifth time two maximums had been made during the main stages of a ranking event, and the fourth time inside a year.

Prize fund
The breakdown of prize money for this year is shown below:

 Winner: £70,000
 Runner-up: £30,000
 Semi-final: £20,000
 Quarter-final: £10,000
 Last 16: £6,000
 Last 32: £3,500
 Last 64: £2,500

Highest break: £2,000
Total: £366,000

The "rolling 147 prize" for a maximum break: £15,000

Main draw

Top half

Section 1

Section 2

Section 3

Section 4

Bottom half

Section 5

Section 6

Section 7

Section 8

Finals

Final

Century breaks
Total: 81 

 147, 140, 140, 136, 103  Neil Robertson
 147, 102  Noppon Saengkham
 140, 134, 127, 122, 115, 101  Jack Lisowski
 140, 108  Liam Highfield
 139, 135, 128, 115, 107  Mark Selby
 139  Lyu Haotian
 136, 127, 121  Joe Perry
 135, 132, 129, 106, 104, 103  Zhao Xintong
 134, 128, 125, 124, 119, 112, 107, 104, 103, 102, 100  Stuart Bingham
 131  Joe O'Connor
 131  Lukas Kleckers
 131  Mei Xiwen
 130, 110  Scott Donaldson
 128  Matthew Selt
 127, 100  Elliot Slessor
 126  Kishan Hirani
 125, 102  Robbie Williams
 122  Alan McManus
 120, 118, 116  Ronnie O'Sullivan
 120, 104  Kurt Maflin
 118, 118  Oliver Lines
 116  Lu Ning
 115  James Cahill
 113  Martin O'Donnell
 106, 103  John Higgins
 106  Hossein Vafaei
 105  Anthony McGill
 105  Thor Chuan Leong
 105  Lee Walker
 104, 103, 102  Ian Burns
 104  Sean O'Sullivan
 104  Jackson Page
 104  Jimmy Robertson
 104  Xiao Guodong
 103  Sam Craigie
 103  Hammad Miah
 102  Shaun Murphy
 100  Mark Allen
 100  Michael Georgiou

References

Home Nations Series
2019
2019 in snooker
2019 in Welsh sport
February 2019 sports events in the United Kingdom
Sports competitions in Cardiff